Hauffe is a German surname. Notable people with the surname include:

Arthur Hauffe (1892–1944), German Wehrmacht general
Friederike Hauffe (1801–1829), German mystic and somnambulist
Gregor Hauffe (born 1982), German rower

German-language surnames